Vince Hamilton (1 March 1916 – 22 March 1989) was an Australian rules footballer who played with Footscray in the Victorian Football League (VFL).

Notes

External links 
 		
 

1916 births
1989 deaths
Australian rules footballers from Victoria (Australia)
Western Bulldogs players